{{Infobox person
| name               = Jens von der Lippe
| image              = 22949 Margrethe og Jens von der Lippe.jpg
| caption            = Margrethe and Jens von der Lippe.
| birth_name         = 
| birth_date         = 
| birth_place        = Christiania, Norway
| death_date         = 
| death_place        = 
| monuments          = 
| nationality        = 
| other_names        = 
| education          = 
| alma_mater         = 
| occupation         = Ceramist, non-fiction writer and educator
| years_active       = 
| employer           = 
| organization       = 
| known_for          = 
| notable_works      = 
| style              = 
| spouse             = 
| partner            = 
| children           = 
| parents            = 
| relatives          = Frits von der LippeJust Lippe
| awards             = 
}}

Jens von der Lippe (13 October 1911 – 17 June 1990) was a Norwegian ceramist, non-fiction writer and educator. He was born in Christiania, and was a brother of Frits von der Lippe and Just Lippe.
He ran a ceramics workshop in Oslo in cooperation with his wife, Margrethe von der Lippe, and many of their works were co-productions. He lectured at the Norwegian National Academy of Craft and Art Industry from 1939 to 1975. He published the book Stråmønsteret – det udødelige blåmalede in 1983.

References

1911 births
1990 deaths
Norwegian ceramists
Artists from Oslo
20th-century ceramists